Norway's geography is dominated by fjords and islands. As of 2011, the country has thirty-three undersea tunnels, most of which are fixed links. Tunnels are chosen to replace ferries to allow residents of islands and remote peninsulas access to regional centers, where water-crossings are too long for bridges. Its length is surpassed by that of the  Karmøy Tunnel, which opened September 5, 2013.

Norway's first subsea tunnel was the Vardø Tunnel, which opened in 1982. Most of the tunnels are built as fixed links, allowing ferry services to be abandoned. In 2010, the first three tunnel in cities, the Bjørvika Tunnel, the Skansen Tunnel and the Knappe Tunnel, were opened, all of which were built as motorways to bypass the city center. Suspended tunnels have been proposed, which could be installed in places too deep for conventional tunnels, such as the Sognefjord.

Current
The following lists all subsea tunnels in use as of 2011. It includes the name, length in meters and feet, depth below mean sea level in meters and feet, the year the tunnel was taken into use with ordinary traffic (which may differ from the year it was officially opened), the road the tunnel carries, the county or counties the tunnel is in, and the municipalities, including any the tunnel passes through. Roads starting with E indicates a European route, while FV indicates a county road without signposted road number; only numbers indicates roadside-numbered county roads which are former national roads.

Under construction
The following tunnels are under construction, but are not yet completed or taken into use.

Proposed
The following includes tunnels which have been proposed and which are either being planned by the Norwegian Public Road Administration, or are in the National Transport Plan 2010–2019. Projects which have been abandoned or have not been subject to public investigations are not included. Several of the most trafficked ferry sections are not currently proposed, as the fjords are too deep to have a tunnel with current technology. As of 2011, there are 160 ferry crossings in the country, the majority of which could potentially be replaced by fixed links. For the authorities, the decision to build new tunnels depends on the length, possibility of building a bridge, depth of the sound or fjord and population in the affected areas. While the first tunnels were mostly part of fixed links to connect island and sealocked communities to the mainland, focus has recently shifted more towards replacing ferries on main roads connecting regions, in particular European Route E39, which runs along the west coast. The largest proposal is for E39 Rogfast, which would replace four ferry services, and would become the world's longest road tunnel and the world's deepest tunnel.

References

See also 
List of tunnels in Norway

 
Norway
Norway transport-related lists
Tunnels, subsea